Mukim Labu is a mukim in Temburong District, Brunei.

Geography 
The mukim is located in the north of Temburong District, bordering Brunei Bay to the north, Lawas District in the Malaysian state of Sarawak to the east, Mukim Batu Apoi to the south, Mukim Bangar to the south-west and the Malaysian Limbang District to the west. Mukim Labu contains several islands: Pulau Selirong, Pulau Selanjak, Pulau Siarau and Pulau Pituat.

Demographics 
As of 2016 census, the population was 590 with  males and  females. The mukim had 124 households occupying 121 dwellings. The entire population lived in rural areas.

Villages 
As of 2016, the mukim comprised the following census villages:

Facilities

Schools 
The government primary schools in the mukim include:
 Labu Estate Primary School
 Piasau-Piasau Primary School

Meanwhile, the government schools for the country's Islamic religious primary education include:
 Labu Estate Religious School
 Piasau-Piasau Religious School

The mukim is the planned home for the permanent campus of Sultan Sharif Ali Islamic University (UNISSA), the country's primary Islamic university, by the royal command of Sultan Hassanal Bolkiah. At present, the university's temporary campus is located in the capital Bandar Seri Begawan.

Mosques 
 Kampong Labu Estate Mosque — inaugurated on 18 October 1982; it can accommodate 200 worshippers.

Border crossing

A road border crossing into Sarawak, Malaysia is located in this mukim, along the road between Bangar and Lawas. Called the Labu checkpoint, the crossing is located at the Brunei–Malaysia border east of Bangar.

The Malaysian checkpoint is called Mengkalap. Before the new immigration, customs and quarantine checkpoint complex at the border was completed, the Mengkalap immigration checkpoint operated out of a shoplot in Trusan Bazaar, about 8 km from the border towards Lawas.

References 

Labu
Temburong District
Brunei–Malaysia border crossings